Jalen Lattrel Ramsey (born October 24, 1994) is an American football cornerback for the Miami Dolphins of the National Football League (NFL). He played college football at Florida State and was drafted by the Jacksonville Jaguars fifth overall in the 2016 NFL Draft.

With the Jaguars, Ramsey quickly became one of the top cornerbacks in the NFL, making the Pro Bowl twice and being named an All-Pro in 2017, in addition to helping Jacksonville snap a 10-year playoff drought. However, following a fallout and standoff with the Jaguars' front office, he was traded to the Los Angeles Rams midway through the 2019 season. In 2020, he agreed to an extension with the Rams that made him the highest-paid defensive back in league history at the time. He was traded to the Miami Dolphins during the 2023 offseason.

Early life
Ramsey was born on October 24, 1994, in Smyrna, Tennessee to Lamont, an emergency medical technician (EMT) and Jalen's training coach, and Margie Ramsey. Jalen's older brother, Jamal, participated in football, basketball, and track at Battle Ground Academy in Franklin, Tennessee, and played quarterback at Middle Tennessee State University in Murfreesboro, Tennessee, where their father had once played football. Jalen perfected his football skills playing with much older boys at a local park. He grew up cheering for the Miami Hurricanes in a family of Florida Gators fans.

High school career
Ramsey attended Ensworth High School in Nashville, Tennessee, during his freshman year. He then transferred to Brentwood Academy in Brentwood, Tennessee, where he was a two-sport star in football and track & field. He was rated by both Rivals.com and Scout.com as a five-star recruit and one of the top overall recruits in his class. He originally committed to the University of Southern California (USC) to play college football, but later changed to Florida State University.

Ramsey had a highly decorated high school track career. On May 24, 2013, in his final high school track meet, he shattered the Tennessee state record in the long jump with a mark of 25′ 3.25″, breaking the 16-year-old record set in 1997. As of 2016, no other athlete in TSSAA history has surpassed the 25-foot mark. Ramsey competed in events ranging from the 100 meters to the shot put. As a sprinter, he recorded personal best times of 10.50 in the 100-meter dash, 21.44 in the 200-meter dash, and 48.02 in the 400-meter dash. Ramsey established personal bests in the high jump at 6′ 8″ and the triple jump 47′ 7″. He also posted a top throw of 49′ 11″ in the shot put.

College career

Football

Ramsey started all 14 games for the Florida State Seminoles as a true freshman in 2013. He was the first true freshman to start a game at cornerback for the Seminoles since Deion Sanders in 1985. Ramsey wore the #13 jersey during his freshman year when Florida State won the National Championship over Auburn. He later switched to jersey #8 for his sophomore and junior seasons. Also, Ramsey chose the #17 jersey for kick returns during his junior year, a number that had been retired in honor of former superstar Charlie Ward, who granted Ramsey permission to wear the number. He recorded a 23-yard fumble return for a touchdown in the 59–3 victory over Wake Forest on November 9, 2013. He finished the year with 49 tackles, one interception, and one sack. As a sophomore, Ramsey played 14 games with 80 tackles, two interceptions, 12 passes defended, three forced fumbles, and two sacks. As a junior, he played 13 games with one sack, nine passes defended, and one fumble recovery on 52 tackles. On September 18, against Boston College, he recorded a 36-yard fumble return for a touchdown in the 14–0 victory. He was named as a Consensus All-American for his performance in the 2015 season. After his junior year, he announced his intention to forgo his senior season and enter the 2016 NFL Draft.

Track and field
Ramsey competed in track & field at Florida State as a relay sprinter and long jumper. He was a three-time All-ACC honoree as a member of the Florida State Indoor and Outdoor championship track and field team in 2013. He placed third in the long jump at both the indoor and outdoor ACC T&F Championships and ran a leg on the conference champion 4×100 relay team at the outdoor meet. During the 2014 season, his best outdoor long jump mark was 25' 0" (7.62m) and his top indoor jump was 24' 11" (7.59m), ranking second nationally among NCAA Division I football players. Ramsey qualified for the NCAA East Preliminary meet in the long jump. He placed third at the 2014 ACC Indoor Championship in the long jump (7.46 m).

In March 2015, Ramsey recorded his personal best jump of 26' 1.75" at the NCAA Indoor Championships. In May 2015, Ramsey won the ACC Long Jump Championship with a leap of 26' 1.5" (7.96m),

College statistics

Professional career
Coming out of Florida State, Ramsey was projected a first round pick by NFL draft experts and scouts. He was considered to be a top ten pick by NFL media analysts Daniel Jeremiah, Charles Davis, and Mike Mayock. He received an invitation to the NFL combine and completed all the combine and positional drills and tied for the top performance in the broad jump and vertical jump.

On March 29, 2016, he chose to participate at Florida State's pro day, along with Roberto Aguayo, Lamarcus Brutus, Terrance Smith, and 20 other prospects. Team representatives and scouts from 31 NFL teams attended, with the Cincinnati Bengals opting not to, and among them included general managers Doug Whaley (Bills), Kevin Colbert (Steelers), Jason Licht (Buccaneers), Jon Robinson (Titans), and Steelers' head coach Mike Tomlin. Ramsey chose to stand on his combine numbers and only perform positional drills. He was ranked as the top free safety prospect in the draft by NFLDraftScout.com, the top overall defensive back prospect by Sports Illustrated, and was ranked the top cornerback by NFL analyst Mike Mayock.

Jacksonville Jaguars
The Jacksonville Jaguars selected Ramsey in the first round with the fifth overall pick in the 2016 NFL Draft. He was the highest cornerback selected in the draft. He was the earliest drafted cornerback in Jaguars' franchise history.

2016 season

On May 19, 2016, Ramsey suffered a small meniscus tear during rookie training camp. He had microfracture surgery on the same knee in his sophomore year of high school. On May 22, 2016, the Jaguars signed Ramsey to a four-year, $23.35 million that included $22.90 million guaranteed and a signing bonus of $15.18 million. On May 24, 2016, Ramsey underwent surgery to repair the torn meniscus.

Head coach Gus Bradley named him the starting cornerback, alongside Davon House. Ramsey made his NFL debut and first start in the season-opener against the Green Bay Packers and recorded three solo tackles in the 27–23 loss. During a Week 8 against the Tennessee Titans, he made a season-high eight combined tackles as the Jaguars lost on the road by a score of 36–22.

On December 18, 2016, Ramsey collected four solo tackles, a season-high five pass deflections, a forced fumble, and recorded his first NFL interception by picking off Brock Osweiler in a 21–20 road loss to the Houston Texans. Following the game, the Jaguars fired head coach Gus Bradley after a 2–12 record. The next week, under interim head coach Doug Marrone, Ramsey made four solo tackles, defended four passes, and intercepted Matt Cassel and returned it for a touchdown, helping the Jaguars defeat the Tennessee Titans by a score of 38–17. Ramsey was named AFC Defensive Player of the Week for his performance against the Titans.

Ramsey finished his rookie season with 65 combined tackles (55 solo), 14 pass deflections, two interceptions, and a touchdown in 16 games and 16 starts. Pro Football Focus gave Ramsey an overall grade of 82.3, which ranked 21st among all qualifying cornerbacks in 2016. He was named to the NFL All-Rookie Team.

2017 season

Ramsey returned as the Jaguars' de facto starting cornerback and joined a revamped secondary that included A. J. Bouye, Aaron Colvin, Barry Church, and Tashaun Gipson. NFL analyst Ike Taylor ranked them the seventh best secondary prior to the season and ranked Ramsey and Bouye the top cornerback tandem.

On September 24, 2017, Ramsey recorded two solo tackles and intercepted a pass attempt from Baltimore Ravens' quarterback Joe Flacco, as the Jaguars routed the Ravens 44–7. During a Week 5 contest against the Pittsburgh Steelers, he collected a season-high seven combined tackles, four pass deflections, and intercepted a pass attempt by Ben Roethlisberger in the Jaguars' 30–9 victory. On November 5, 2017, Ramsey was ejected during a 23–7 victory over the Cincinnati Bengals after an altercation that began with him pushing Cincinnati Bengals wide receiver A. J. Green to the ground and ended with several punches thrown. On December 19, 2017, Ramsey was named to his first Pro Bowl as a starter alongside teammate Bouye. Ramsey started all 16 games in 2017 and made 63 combined tackles (52 solo), 17 pass deflections, and four interceptions. Pro Football Focus gave Ramsey an overall grade of 91.8, which ranked second among all qualifying cornerbacks in 2017. In addition, he was named as a First Team All-Pro.

The Jaguars finished the season atop the AFC South with a 10–6 record and claiming the #3-seed in the AFC. They defeated the Buffalo Bills in the Wild Card Round, 10–3. In Ramsey's playoff debut, he recorded two solo tackles, one pass defensed, and one interception. His interception came late in the fourth quarter when he picked off Bills' quarterback Nathan Peterman, who had just entered the game for the injured Tyrod Taylor, and sealed the win for the Jaguars. In the Divisional Round against the Pittsburgh Steelers, he finished with four total tackles in the 45–42 road victory at Heinz Field. In the AFC Championship against the New England Patriots, he finished with two total tackles in the 24–20 defeat at Gillette Stadium. He was ranked 17th by his fellow players on the NFL Top 100 Players of 2018.

2018 season

In the 2018 season, Ramsey started all 16 games and totaled 65 total tackles, three interceptions, and 13 passes defensed as the Jaguars finished with a 5–11 record. On November 18, against the Pittsburgh Steelers, he had two interceptions, three passes defensed, and a career-high eight total tackles in the 20–16 home loss. He had a multi-interception game for the first time in his professional career. He started every game in the 2018 season and finished with 65 total tackles, 13 passes defensed, and three interceptions. He was named to his second Pro Bowl, where he switched positions and caught a receiving touchdown from Houston Texans quarterback Deshaun Watson in the fourth quarter. He was ranked 27th by his fellow players on the NFL Top 100 Players of 2019.

2019 season

On April 25, 2019, the Jaguars picked up the fifth-year option on Ramsey's contract. Ramsey started the Jaguars' first three games, totaling 13 solo tackles with a pass deflection and a forced fumble. However, during a 13–12 loss to the Houston Texans in Week 2, Ramsey was involved in a verbal altercation with Jaguars head coach Doug Marrone, and the player and coach had to be physically restrained from each other. The following day, reports surfaced that Ramsey was demanding a trade, but he started the following week in a 20–7 victory over the Tennessee Titans, the Jaguars' first victory of the season. The following week, Ramsey was placed on the inactive list, with the team announcing that Ramsey would be absent in order to attend the birth of his second child. Ramsey would never play for the Jaguars again, remaining on Jacksonville's inactive list from Week 4 through Week 6.

Los Angeles Rams
On October 15, 2019, Ramsey was traded to the Los Angeles Rams in exchange for a 2020 first-round pick (eventually used on K'Lavon Chaisson), a 2021 first-round pick (eventually used on Travis Etienne), and a 2021 fourth-round pick.

2019 season

During Week 16 against the San Francisco 49ers on Saturday Night Football, Ramsey recorded his first interception of the season off a pass thrown by Jimmy Garoppolo in the first quarter during the 34–31 road loss. In the final minute on third and 16, he and safety Taylor Rapp made an error in coverage which resulted in a 46-yard completion to wide receiver Emmanuel Sanders, eventually leading to the game-winning field goal which knocked the Rams out of playoff contention. Overall, in the 2019 season, Ramsey finished with 50 tackles, five passes defensed, two forced fumbles, and one interception. He earned a third consecutive Pro Bowl nomination. He was ranked 37th by his fellow players on the NFL Top 100 Players of 2020.

2020 season

On September 9, 2020, Ramsey signed a five-year, $105 million extension with the Rams, including $71.2 million guaranteed. The deal made him the highest-paid defensive back in NFL history.

Following a 17–9 Week 4 victory against the New York Giants, a fight broke out between Ramsey and his ex-girlfriend’s brother Golden Tate after the game was over due in part to Ramsey’s comments against Tate’s sister Breanna who had two children with him.
On October 10, 2020, Ramsey was fined $15,625 for his role in the postgame fight. Ramsey finished the 2020 season with 44 total tackles, one interception, and nine passes defensed in 15 games. He earned First Team All-Pro honors and his second Pro Bowl nomination for 2020. He was ranked 13th by his fellow players on the NFL Top 100 Players of 2021.

2021 season

On June 13, 2021, Ramsey announced during the Rams minicamp that he would officially change his number to 5 per the new NFL jersey number rule.

Ramsey finished the 2021 regular season with 77 tackles and four interceptions. Ramsey and the Rams defeated the Cincinnati Bengals in the Super Bowl 23–20, earning Ramsey's first career Super Bowl championship. In the Super Bow, Ramsey had four total tackles and one pass defensed. He earned First Team All-Pro honors and a Pro Bowl nomination for 2021. He was ranked ninth by his fellow players on the NFL Top 100 Players of 2022.

2022 season
On June 21, Ramsey underwent shoulder surgery. It was revealed that Ramsey had tears in both shoulders during the entire 2021 season.

Miami Dolphins

2023 season
On March 15, 2023, Ramsey was traded to the Miami Dolphins in exchange for a 2023 third-round draft pick and tight end Hunter Long.

NFL career statistics

Regular season

Postseason

Personal life
Ramsey is a Christian. He frequently mentions his faith on his social media accounts.

In July 2018, Ramsey and Breanna Tate, the younger sister of NFL wide receiver Golden Tate, had a daughter together. The pair had a second daughter in September 2019, though they had broken up earlier that summer.

Ramsey was known for his trash talk both on and off the field, primarily during his time with Jacksonville. Notable examples include Ramsey's altercation with Cincinnati Bengals wide receiver A. J. Green in 2017, which was caused by his trash talk, and banter between him and Kansas City Chiefs wide receiver Tyreek Hill prior to a 2018 matchup between the Jaguars and Chiefs. In an August 2018 interview with GQ, Ramsey also offered his unfiltered opinions of several NFL quarterbacks, criticizing Joe Flacco, Josh Allen, Andrew Luck, Eli Manning, Ben Roethlisberger, Matt Ryan, Jared Goff, among others. In 2019 during a game against the rival Seattle Seahawks, Ramsey engaged in an altercation with Seahawks’ then-rookie receiver DK Metcalf. Ramsey was not charged for the penalty nor fined by the league after the incident, however; DK Metcalf was given a penalty.

Filmography

References

External links
 
 Jalen Ramsey on Twitter
  Los Angeles Rams bio
 Florida State Seminoles bio

1994 births
Living people
All-American college football players
American Conference Pro Bowl players
American football cornerbacks
American football safeties
Florida State Seminoles football players
Florida State Seminoles men's track and field athletes
Jacksonville Jaguars players
Los Angeles Rams players
Miami Dolphins players
People from Smyrna, Tennessee
Players of American football from Tennessee
National Conference Pro Bowl players